Fuckfest is the debut album of Oxbow, released in 1989 on the band's own CFY Records, and later successively through Pathological Records, Crippled Dick Hot Wax, and Hydra Head Recordings, among others.

Track listing

Personnel 
Musicians
Greg Davis – drums, percussion (A1, B1)
Tom Dobrov – drums, percussion (A2, B2)
Eugene S. Robinson – vocals
Niko Wenner – guitars, piano, bass guitar, production, arrangements
Klaus Flouride – bass guitar (A1)
Gibbs Chapman – bass guitar (A3)
Adam Cantwell – bass guitar (B3)
Other personnel
Bart Thurber – recording
Jim Blanchard – artwork, design

References

External links
 

1989 albums
Oxbow (band) albums